Blackpool F.C. Ladies are an English women's association football club affiliated with Blackpool F.C. Founded in 2008 from the Girls setup that was established in 2004.

History

The Ladies competed their inaugural season in the Lancashire FA Women's County League Division Two, which sits at the seventh level of the national League system in women's football in England.

In their first season, they won all eighteen league games, scoring 133 goals, and won promotion as champions to Lancashire FA Division One for the 2009–10 season. They were also runners-up in the Lancashire League Cup after a 1–0 defeat to Morecambe in the final.

After one season in charge, Michael O'Neill left the club to join Kendal Town FC as first team fitness coach and was succeeded by former Preston North End player Mac Barlow. Barlow, who was part of the County Division Two side that won promotion, brought in Dave Kelly, Marco Vidoretti and former Greenock Morton winger Mick Perrett to form the management team for that season. In the 2009–10 season they again won promotion as Champions and for the second consecutive season were runners-up in the Lancashire FA County Cup after a 3–1 extra-time defeat to Rochdale in the final.

In the 2010–11 season, Barlow added one more coach to the set up: Chris Stammers. Blackpool were defeated in their opening game of the season and finally lost their unbeaten status in the League as they went down 3–1 to Wren Rovers. However, just days later Blackpool secured a 2–0 victory in the reverse fixture at Bruce Park.  Blackpool's first game in the FA Women's Cup resulted in a 3–2 defeat at Penrith. Nonetheless, Blackpool won all but one of their remaining League games. The Ladies were boosted in particular by a 6–0 victory at home to Carlisle. This was a significant fixture as it was the first time that Blackpool F.C. had hosted their own Ladies team at Bloomfield Road in a competitive League fixture.
Blackpool were crowned Champions of the North West Women's Regional Division One North after a 2–1 victory over Morecambe at Hallgate Park on the final day of the season, thus giving them their third promotion in as many seasons.

In the 2011–2012 season, Blackpool FC announced that First Team Coach Dave Kelly had been appointed as First Team manager so Mac Barlow was to focus on her playing career. Dave Kelly then appointed Chris Vickers as the new First Team Coach. Blackpool F.C. Ladies finished second in the North West Women's Premier League. They hosted a second fixture at Bloomfield Road at home to Bury, in which they won 3–1. The season wasn't without silverware, Blackpool FC emphatically beat local rivals Blackpool Wren Rovers 4–1 in the League Cup Final, at the home of Airbus UK, to secure their first Cup Victory of their short history. Manager Dave Kelly described his squad as "special" and a "proud day for all involved at the club" 

The following 2012–13 season, the Ladies reached the FA Cup First Round Proper for the first time in their history. However, they were defeated 4–0 away to Durham who were later announced as members of the inaugural WSL 2. The Ladies finished just two points behind League Winners Tranmere Rovers and once again claimed the runners up spot for the second season running. In the final fixtures of the season, they finished the season in emphatic style, defeating League rivals Morecambe 4–1  and Crewe Alexandra 5–2 at Bloomfield Road to create an exciting finish to the season and send a resounding message to their title and promotion rivals.

At the beginning of the pre-season for the 2013–14 season Blackpool FC announced that Ladies First Team Manager Dave Kelly had agreed a deal to join North Toronto Soccer Club and First Team Coach Chris Vickers would succeed him as First Team Manager.

Stadium

Blackpool F.C. Ladies first team home matches are played at the HASSRA Sports Pavilion in Thornton-Cleveleys as of the 2022–23 season. They also play some of their fixtures at Bloomfield Road.

Historically Blackpool F.C. Ladies played at Hallgate Park, Stalmine, home of West Lancashire Football League side Wyre Villa.

Current squad

2022–23
The squad according to The Football Association (FA) website at the time of the 2022–23 season.

 Elizabeth Bradley
 Ashleigh Bradshaw
 Chloe Chambers
 Yulan Chandelaney
 Angel Cooper
 Millie Dawson
 Alice Earnshaw
 Bethany Edwards
 Jordyn Ellison
 Levi Felton
 Lily Hambly
 Charlotte Hartley
 Chloe Howarth
 Megan Illingworth
 Molly Kelly
 Jessica Lean
 Moesha Lyon
 Keira Masterson
 Keisha Masterson
 Kayleigh Monaghan
 Emily Murray
 Lottie Murray
 Lauren Oatley
 April Oldfield
 Caitlin Packer
 Maisie Rogers
 Minnie Rogers
 Emily Salthouse
 Katie Smith
 Ellie Spooner
 Cloe Warbrick

Historical squads

Circa 2017–18
The squad according to The Football Association (FA) website around the time of the 2017–18 season.

 Amy Bennett
 Lydia Black
 Elizabeth Bradley
 Rebecca Brownwood
 Eleanor Cardwell
 Charmaine Cardwell-Wilsdon
 Natalie Cessford
 Magan Eadie
 Megan Eadie
 Alice Earnshaw
 Jordyn Ellison
 Lily Hambly
 Megan Illingworth
 Rebecca Knight
 Louise Latham
 Erin Menzies
 Kayleigh Monaghan
 Aleysha Montgomery
 April Oldfield
 India Rogers
 Beth Slate
 Hannah Speake
 Ellie Spooner
 Gemma Thrower
 Natasha Webster

2012

Reserve and Girls teams
In 2011, they established a reserve side, managed by Mick Perrett. The team was made up of the majority of the double-winning under-18 team from the previous season. They finished third in the Lancashire FA County Division Two. For the 2012–13 season preference was given to re-establishing a youth team, and so there will be no reserve side.

There are six other age group teams: Under-10s, Under-11s, Under-12s, Under 13s, Under-14s and Under-16s, all of which compete in the West Lancashire Girls Football League. This is also run in conjunction with a Development Centre for girls between 5 and 11.

The Girls teams are based at Bourne Poacher playing fields, Fleetwood Road North, Thornton Cleveleys.

Non-playing staff
As of 14 November 2022.

Honours

Blackpool F.C. Ladies

 Lancashire FA Women's County League Division Two Champions: 2008–09
 Lancashire FA Women's County League Division One Champions: 2009–10
 North West Women's Regional Football League Division One (North) Champions: 2010–11
 North West Women's Regional Football League Cup Champions: 2011–12
 North West Women's Regional Football League Premier Division Runners Up:  2011-12 & 2012–13.

Blackpool F.C. Youth Team

 West Lancashire Girls Football League Under-18 League Champions: 2010–11
 West Lancashire Girls Football League Under-18 League Cup Winners: 2010–11

Blackpool F.C. Under-16s

 Lancashire FA Under-16 League Runners-up: 2009–10
 Lancashire FA Under-16 Lancashire Cup Winners: 2009–10
 Tesco North West Regional Finals Under 16 Girls Regional Cup Runners Up: 2009–10

Blackpool F.C. Under-15s

 West Lancashire Girls Football League Under-15 League Runners Up: 2010–11
 West Lancashire Girls Football League Under-15 League Cup Runners Up: 2010–11

Blackpool F.C. Under-14s

 West Lancashire Girls Football League Under-14 League Champions: 2009–10
 West Lancashire Girls Football League Under-14 League Cup Winners: 2009–10

Blackpool F.C. Under-13s
 West Lancashire Girls Football League Under-13 League Champions: 2011–12.
 West Lancashire Girls Football League Under-12 League Cup Winners: 2011–12.
 West Lancashire Girls Football League Under-13 League Runners Up: 2010–11
 West Lancashire Girls Football League Under-13 League Cup Winners: 2009–10

Blackpool F.C. Under-12s
 West Lancashire Girls Football League Under-12 League Champions: 2009–10, 2010–11.
 West Lancashire Girls Football League Under-12 League Cup Winners: 2009–10, 2010–11.
 West Lancashire Girls Football League Under-12 Challenge Cup Winners: 2009–10, 2010–11.

Blackpool F.C. Under-11s
 West Lancashire Girls Football League Under-11 League Champions: 2009–10
 West Lancashire Girls Football League Under-11 League Cup Winners: 2009–10
 West Lancashire Girls Football League Under-11 Challenge Cup Winners: 2009–10

References

External links
Official website

Ladies
Association football clubs established in 2008
Association football clubs established in 2004
Football clubs in Lancashire
Women's football clubs in England
Sport in Blackpool
2008 establishments in England
2004 establishments in England